Tenten may refer to:
・・・・・・・・・, a former Japanese idol group 
Tenten, a character in Naruto media
Ford Ten-Ten, a Ford Motor Company vehicle
Ten-ten or dakuten, a diacritic sign in Japanese writing
The Japanese title of Adrift in Tokyo, a 2007 movie
Tenten Koganei, an antagonist in Sumomomo Momomo.
TenTen Corpus Family – set of comparable text corpora
Tenten Producing Team, a group of KPOP Composers from Cube Entertainment
Tintin, in Turkish popular culture Tintin.

See also
1010 (disambiguation)
10:10, the climate change campaign